The Fire on the Snow is a verse play by Douglas Stewart about the Terra Nova Expedition to Antarctica by Robert Falcon Scott. It premiered on ABC radio on 6 June 1941 to great acclaim.

Original production
The original production was produced by Frank Clewlow and was to have starred Peter Finch as Scott, but he joined the army only four days before broadcast, so Frank Harvey replaced him. Clewlow decided to employ a female actor, Ida Osbourne, as narrator to contrast with the all-male cast. No copy of this original production exists.

Subsequent productions
The play has been performed on radio several times since, including a later production starring Peter Finch for Frank Clelow and one directed by Tyrone Guthrie for the BBC in 1951.

The play was published in 1945.

Original radio cast
Frank Harvey as Robert Falcon Scott
John Tate as Edward Adrian Wilson
Lou Vernon as Lawrence Oates
Peter Bathurst as Henry Bowers
John Alden as Edgar Evans
Ida Elizabeth Osbourne as narrator

References

External links
Australian theatre productions of the play at AusStage
The Fire on the Snow at AustLit
"Playing the 20th century – episode three: The Fire On The Snow" Radio National 2 Jan 2011 – includes performance of the play

Australian plays
Australian radio dramas
1941 plays
Plays based on actual events
Antarctica in fiction